Clay Andrews Racing was a NASCAR Busch Series team. They formerly fielded the No. 84 Hype Technologies Chevrolet Monte Carlo in the NASCAR Busch Series.  The team was led by Billy Wilburn, a former Penske Racing mechanic and later crew chief. They signed Randel King as their development driver. King was released from his contract once the team decided to close down. King then spent a few seasons racing for smaller development teams such as Position One Motorsports and other family run operations. It is currently unknown what future may lie for this young driver, and whether or not he will get another chance. He is occasionally seen at tracks assisting in driver coaching. 

They picked up their first and only win with rookie David Gilliland in 2006 at the Meijer 300 at Kentucky Speedway. In July 2006, the team announced it had closed its doors, with plans to return in three years. The team has since formed the Clay Andrews Alliance Partners Organization, a group of independent NASCAR teams that share info and sponsorship funds.

Car No. 84 results

External links 
Homepage

Defunct NASCAR teams
American auto racing teams